"Naah" is a Punjabi single by Harrdy Sandhu featuring Nora Fatehi.

Background
The song was written and composed by Jaani and arranged by B. Praak. The dance choreography was arranged and shot by Arvindr Khaira, while the video features the Moroccan model Nora Fatehi as Sandhu's love interest.

Reception
The song is one of the most viewed Punjabi songs on YouTube. As of 11 December 2021 it has 530 million views on YouTube.

Bollywood
Song "Naah" was remade for the film Bala as Naah Goriye with singer Swasti Mehul. The song had Ayushmann Khurana, Harrdy Sandhu, Sonam Bajwa grooving to the beats in the visuals.

Personnel

 Song : Naah
 Artist : Harrdy Sandhu
 Starring : Harrdy Sandhu, Nora Fatehi
 Lyrics & Composition : Jaani
 Music : B Praak
 Recording Studio : Studio Fuzz , Delhi
 Mixing & Mastering : Eric Pillai (Future Sound Of Bombay)
 Video Director : Arvindr Khaira
 DOP : Bhanu Pratap
 Editor : Adele Pereira
 Colorist : Nadeem Akhtar
 Assistant Director : Harman Buttar
 Choreographer : Sahaj Singh , Shreoshi Kumar
 Hair Styling (Harrdy Sandhu) : Ali Khan
 Hair Styling & Make Up (Nora) : Juan Marcelo Pedrozo
 Costume Styling (Nora) : Sunakshi Kansal
 Publicity Creatives / Designs : Roop Kamal Singh & Aman Kalsi
 Digital Promotions : Lovish Kathuria
 Label : Sony Music India

References

2017 singles